Christopher Robinson (May 15, 1806 – October 3, 1889) was a United States representative from Rhode Island.

He was born in Providence on May 15, 1806 and graduated from Brown University in 1825.

He studied law and was admitted to the bar in 1833. He commenced practice in Woonsocket, Rhode Island. He was elected Attorney General of Rhode Island in 1854.  He then was elected as a Republican to the Thirty-sixth Congress (March 4, 1859 – March 3, 1861).  He was an unsuccessful candidate for reelection.

He was appointed Minister to Peru from 1861–1866, and was a delegate from Rhode Island to the Loyalist Convention held in Philadelphia in 1866. He died in Woonsocket on October 3, 1889. His grave is in Oak Hill Cemetery.

Sources

1806 births
1889 deaths
Politicians from Providence, Rhode Island
Brown University alumni
19th-century American diplomats
Rhode Island Attorneys General
Republican Party members of the United States House of Representatives from Rhode Island
19th-century American politicians
Ambassadors of the United States to Peru